The Optica Fellow is a membership designation of Optica (formerly known as The Optical Society (OSA)) that denotes distinguished scientific accomplishment. The bylaws of this society only allow 10% of its membership to be designated as an Optica Fellow. The Optica Fellow requires peer group nomination.

The nominee
An Optica member can only become an Optica Fellow when nominated by a peer group of other current Optica Fellows. Review of the nomination is then passed to the Optica Fellow Members Committee. This committee then nominates the candidate to the Board of Directors on an annual basis. Finally, the purpose of this award is to designate a member as one who has "made significant contributions to the advancement of optics".

The process
The process includes actively identifying possible candidates who might qualify for this award. Contributing factors for qualification are diverse within the optics community. These factors include significant or distinguishing scientific accomplishments, technical achievements, inventions, technical innovations, technical management, and demonstration of leadership. The fields of such achievement are significant instrument technique, and measurement technique (including original software). Other fields include distinguished sustained accomplishments in engineering, education, and service to the global optics community (including photonics and Optica). Other factors may also include a record of significant publications, patents, and invited review papers for the various levels of meetings related to the covered fields.

Letters of recommendation are solicited from outside the nominee's field of work. Finally references from at least three and no more than five people familiar with the nominee's work are required. Once all the relevant information has been considered, the Optica Fellow Members Committee votes on the applications and those selected are forwarded to the Board of Directors.

List of notable Optica Fellows

References

Optica (society)
Physics societies
Fellows of learned societies